Naugles was a Southern California fast-food Mexican restaurant chain that existed from 1970 to 1995. A revived Naugles chain was established in 2015 by entrepreneur Christian Ziebarth, after it was ruled that the trademarks had been abandoned by the original company's successor, Del Taco.

History
Naugles was founded by former Del Taco partner Dick Naugle. The first Naugles restaurant was located at the southwest corner of 14th St. and Brockton Avenue, in Riverside, California (now a Del Taco) in 1970. Naugle's motto was "Prepare food fresh. Serve customer fast. Keep place clean!"

Harold Butler purchased Naugles in 1979 when the chain consisted of three restaurants. The chain was expanded by a system of non-exclusive franchises, which later was ruled unlawful by a federal court. Butler built Naugles up to 275 restaurants by 1984, when he sold the chain to Collins Foods International.  Naugles merged with Del Taco in 1988 when businessman Anwar Soliman purchased both companies at nearly the same time. A few of the Naugles menu items, such as those with the "Macho" designation, found their way into the regular Del Taco menu. Also, the Naugles Taco Sandwich (Del Taco called it a "bun taco") can still be ordered from Del Taco even though it does not appear as an item listed on the menu.

Later in May 1989, Soliman announced that he was going to convert most of the 171 Naugles locations to Del Taco by the end of that summer. By the time Soliman sold the integrated company in January 1990 to a four-member group of Del Taco managers led by President Wayne W. Armstrong, there were 59 Naugles left with 25 located in California and 34 located in Utah, Nevada, Missouri and Arizona with 290 Del Tacos in California plus a lone Del Taco in Arizona. In August 1992, only 31 Naugles in the states of Utah, Nevada, Missouri, and Illinois remained with all the locations in California had been converted.

In March 1994, Del Taco converted seven of 8 remaining Naugles locations in Nevada to the Del Taco brand. The last Naugles to close in Nevada was in 1995, in Carson City, Nevada. That Hwy 50 Naugles Carson City location was not converted to a Del Taco, but in late 1995 became a Carson City Restaurant called China East. Del Taco stated that the Nevada conversions led to a great increase in sales at those locations. Seven months later, Del Taco announced it had completed converting all six remaining Naugles locations in the state of Utah in October 1994. In December 1994, Del Taco announced that they have finished converting all four Naugles in the metropolitan St. Louis area. According to the 1994 article in the St. Louis Post-Dispatch, the four Naugles locations in St. Louis were the last sites that were converted to Del Taco.

The last four remaining Naugles locations, all in Nevada, closed in 1994–1995. In the Las Vegas area, 3 restaurants closed circa 1994/95. The last Naugles location, in Carson City Nevada, on Hwy 50 East, closed in 1995.

Revival

In August 2006, blogger Christian Ziebarth posted a remembrance page on his year old Orange County Mexican Restaurants blog site on how he missed the defunct Naugles restaurant chain and wanted Del Taco to bring back some of the old but unique Naugles food items. In a short time, he received comments from hundreds of others who felt the same. So much interest was generated by his webpage that a Del Taco public relations staffer contacted Ziebarth to see how Del Taco could take advantage of this renewed interest.

On May 31, 2012, the Orange County Register reported that a group was attempting to revive the Naugles brand. On July 9, 2013, the OC Weekly ran a similar story, with the author of the piece mentioning he had tried some Naugles taco sauce.

On March 31, 2015, Christian Ziebarth (President), Josh Maxwell (CEO) and Dan Dvorak (CMO) won the judgment from the Trademark Trial and Appeal Board, allowing the restaurant to return to life as a new spot in Fountain Valley, California. In the years since first applying to take up the Naugles trademark and menu (back in 2010), Ziebarth and chef John Smittle went on to re-create the original menu and its flavors from scratch, and Ziebarth, Maxwell and Dvorak began hosting pop-ups at various locations to further gather ground support.

Ziebarth, Maxwell and Dvorak decided to open a "test" kitchen to help shape the brand and on July 25, 2015, the Fountain Valley location had a "soft opening" primarily for fans from an unofficial Facebook fan page. The current menu includes bean and cheese burritos, hard and soft-shelled tacos, cups of beans, drinks, and more. The Naugles location is at 18471 Mt. Langley Street in Fountain Valley.

The Fountain Valley location did a soft opening on Saturday, July 25, 2015 and was overwhelmed by the fans response resulting in running out of food a few times during the day and decided to close the next day (Sunday).  They opened back up Monday, again, ran out of food and closed early to prepare enough food for the apparent demand and opened back up Tuesday July 28, 2015. The Fountain Valley location went seven days a week for the following two weeks and decided to only be open on the weekends due to the neighbors being a bit concerned with the high traffic and limited parking. The Test Kitchen held these hours until May 28, 2016. It then closed for revamping until it re-opened October 2016 and has been open seven days a week from 8 AM to 8 PM since. 

The revived Naugles opened its first daily operating location at 21351 Pacific Coast Highway in Huntington Beach on May 28, 2016, taking over a former Wahoo's Fish Taco across from the Waterfront Hilton. The initial lease was for the summer of 2016. At the end of this time, Josh Maxwell (CEO) said he would evaluate the performance of the operation at this location before deciding to renew the lease. The lease was renewed and has served as a great beach front seasonal location to date. 

On January 25, 2020, a third location was opened at 12120 Beach Boulevard, in Stanton.  The third opening came after months of preparation and conversion from the old restaurant that was on that site, The Mad Greek. It is the first of the revived chains to have a Drive Thru and the first drive-thru in Orange County since the last Naugles was converted to Del Taco circa 1995. This soft opening had an overwhelming response on the first day. Stanton is in a "soft opening" period and 7 AM to 11 PM will be the temporary daily schedule until the Grand Opening which will be announced soon. Stanton is generating plenty of nostalgic memories and new fans of the menu as is referenced by the Naugles fan club group on Facebook.

In popular culture
In the original Naugles TV commercials, the character of Señor Naugles was played by two successive  character actors, Roger C. Carmel and comedian Avery Schreiber.

References

Fast-food Mexican restaurants
Defunct fast-food chains in the United States
Defunct restaurants in California
Defunct restaurant chains in the United States
Companies based in Riverside, California
Restaurants established in 1970
Restaurants disestablished in 1993
1970 establishments in California
1993 disestablishments in California
Re-established companies
Restaurants established in 2015
2015 establishments in California
Restaurants in Orange County, California